Wallqa Wallqa (Quechua wallqa collar, the reduplication indicates that there is a group or a complex of something, "a complex of collars", Hispanicized spelling Hualca Hualca) is a mountain in the Andes of Peru, about  high. It is situated in the Apurímac Region, Antabamba Province, Antabamba District. Wallqa Wallqa lies south-west of the mountains Sara Sara and Runtu Quri, near the northern border of the Arequipa Region.

See also 
 Inti Utka

References 

Mountains of Peru
Mountains of Apurímac Region